Werther is a town in the district of Gütersloh in the state of North Rhine-Westphalia, Germany. It is located near the Teutoburg Forest, approximately 10 km (6 miles) north-west of Bielefeld. It is best known for the Werther's Original caramel sweets, which are nowadays produced in the nearby city of Halle. Werther has one Gesamtschule and one Gymnasium, which has an exchange partnership with a Yarm School, an independent school in Yarm, England.

People 
 August Oberwelland, entrepreneur, company founder

References